Spectacle Island is a 114-acre island in Boston Harbor,  offshore of downtown Boston, Massachusetts. It is part of the city of Boston. The island has a varied history, and today is a public park with a marina, visitor center, cafe, lifeguarded swimming beach, and five miles of walking trails, forming part of the Boston Harbor Islands National Recreation Area. It is served all year by ferries from Boston, and on weekends and summer weekdays by a shuttle boat to and from nearby islands.

Topography

The name is believed to derive from its then-resemblance to a pair of spectacles.

The island is now composed of two artificial earth mounds, terraced with retaining walls, roads and newly planted vegetation. The island's inner harbor  acreage is 114, with 85.5 upland acres and 28.4 intertidal acres.

History

Starting in the early 19th century, the island was used exclusively for its relative remoteness from Boston. A horse rendering plant was built on Spectacle Island in 1857, followed by a city trash incinerator that remained active until 1935.  When the incinerator closed, trash was simply dumped on the island for the next thirty years. A bulldozer was supposedly swallowed up by the trash sometime during the 1950s.  The island remained a smelly, leaking dump until the 1990s.

Two sets of range lights were erected on the island by the United States Lighthouse Service. The Spectacle Island Range Lights were established in 1897 to mark the last leg of the channel into Boston itself, past Governor's Island; they were not long-lived and were discontinued in 1913. The Broad Sound Channel Inner Range Lights were first lit in 1903 and discontinued around 1950; these indicated the middle leg of the trip. No trace of any of these lights remains.

When the Central Artery/Third Harbor Tunnel Project, or the Big Dig, began work in Boston in 1992, some of the project's excavated dirt and clay was used to resurface the island.  The island was covered and built up by dirt, capped with two feet of clay, and covered with two to five feet of topsoil.  Thousands of trees were planted, and paths, buildings, and a dock were built.

Spectacle Island opened to the public in June 2006 for use as a recreational area with hiking trails, a beach, a visitors' center with cafe, and a marina with 38 boat slips for visitors.

Transportation 

Spectacle Island is accessible to the public either through a ferry from Long Wharf or to private watercraft at the island's marina. Ferries run from and to Boston as well as from and to Georges Island.  The marina was closed for almost two years in the late 2010s due to repairs required as the result of a storm in the winter of 2015. As of July 2017, the marina is open and public moorings are available.

Popular culture
 Spectacle Island is featured in the video game Fallout 4.
 The island plays an important role in the novel Zodiac: An Eco-Thriller, by author Neal Stephenson.
Spectacle Island is mentioned in the book The Speckled Monster by Jennifer Lee Carrell. It is described as a quarantine island used especially during the smallpox epidemic as a place for ships carrying disease to unload ill passengers.

Images

Notes 

My grandfather was superintendent on Spectacle from approx 1923 until the landfill closed the 1950'. The landfill was always composting and there were occasional fires when things got too hot. A tractor did indeed fall through the surface. Operations were stopped immediately and the landfill eventually closed.
It was a wonderful place for a child to visit his grandfather and wonder around the island.

External links

National Park Service
Boston Harbor Islands page on Spectacle Island
Boston Harbor Islands video: A History of Spectacle Island

Boston Harbor islands
Islands of Massachusetts
Islands of Suffolk County, Massachusetts